Léon Hese (born 10 March 1981 in Arnhem) is a Dutch former footballer. He played for De Graafschap, Helmond Sport, FC Eindhoven, PSV, SC Cambuur and Spakenburg.

References

1981 births
Living people
Footballers from Arnhem
Association football central defenders
Dutch footballers
PSV Eindhoven players
FC Eindhoven players
Helmond Sport players
De Graafschap players
SC Cambuur players
Eredivisie players
Eerste Divisie players
Derde Divisie players